In 1866 the South Eastern Counties Junction Railway was incorporated to build from a point on the Stanstead, Shefford and Chambly Railroad to a point on the province line in the township of Potton, Quebec which was completed in 1873. Soon afterwards, the railway amalgamated with the Richelieu, Drummond and Arthabaska Counties Railway, the combined lines being known as the South Eastern Railway.

After many years of haphazard running and accumulated deficits, it was eventually taken over by the Canadian Pacific Railway which had leased the South Eastern in 1887 and which subsequently continued to operate the line.

References

Defunct Quebec railways
Defunct Vermont railroads